Erin Brady is an American politician who has represented Chittenden District 2 in the Vermont House of Representatives since 2020.  She graduated from Colorado College and Harvard Graduate School of Education.

References

External links

Living people
Democratic Party members of the Vermont House of Representatives
Women state legislators in Vermont
21st-century American women politicians
21st-century American politicians
Colorado College alumni
Harvard Graduate School of Education alumni
People from Williston, Vermont
Year of birth missing (living people)